In Norse mythology, Sumarr (Old Norse: , "Summer") and Vetr ("Winter") are personified seasons. Sumarr and Vetr, personified, are attested in the Poetic Edda, compiled in the 13th century from earlier traditional sources, and the Prose Edda, written in the 13th century by Snorri Sturluson. In both, the two are given genealogies, while in the Prose Edda the two figure into a number of kennings used by various skalds.

Attestations

Poetic Edda
In the stanza 26 of the  Poetic Edda poem Vafþrúðnismál, the god Odin (disguised as "Gagnráðr") asks the jötunn Vafþrúðnir  from where warm Sumarr and Vetr come from, stating that they arrived "first among the Wise powers". In stanza 27, Vafþrúðnir responds:
Wind-cool [Vindsvalr] he is called, Winter's [Vetr's] father,
and Mild-One [Svásuðr], the father of Summer [Sumarr].
The second half of this stanza is missing from early manuscripts, but some later manuscripts feature the addition of:
And both of these shall ever be
Till the gods to destruction go.

Prose Edda
In chapter 19 of the Prose Edda book Gylfaginning, Gangleri (king Gylfi in disguise) asks why there's an evident difference between summer and winter. The enthroned figure of High responds, and (after scolding him for asking a question everyone knows the answer to) states that the father of Sumarr is Svásuðr, who is quite pleasant, while the father of Vetr is referred to as Vindsvalr or, alternately, Vindljóni, and that Vetr derives his countenance from his ancestors, as they are "cruel and cold-hearted kinsmen".

Sumarr and Vetr are additionally personified in the Prose Edda book Skáldskaparmál, where they are referred to in kennings. Kennings for Sumarr are given in chapter 30, including "son of Svásuðr", "comfort of the snakes", "growth of men", exemplified in an excerpt given from a work by the skald Egill Skallagrímsson where "Valley-fish's mercy" points to "Snake's mercy", which signifies "Summer". Kennings are given for Vetr in chapter 26; "Son of Vindsvalr", "snake's death", and "storm season". Excerpts of works by the skalds Ormr Steinþórsson (who uses the kenning "Vindsvalr's son") and Ásgrímr (who employs the kenning "snake woe") are then given as examples. Both Sumarr and Vetr are given as terms for "times" in chapter 63.

Notes

References

 Bellows, Henry Adams (Trans.) (1936). The Poetic Edda. Princeton University Press.
 Byock, Jesse (Trans.) (2005). The Prose Edda. Penguin Classics. 
 Faulkes, Anthony (Trans.) (1995). Edda. Everyman. 
 Larrington, Carolyne (Trans.) (1999). The Poetic Edda. Oxford World's Classics. 
 Orchard, Andy (1997). Dictionary of Norse Myth and Legend. Cassell. 

Personifications in Norse mythology
Seasons
Mythological duos